Matthias Stammann (born May 8, 1968) is a German former professional footballer who played as a midfielder.

External links

1968 births
Living people
German footballers
East German footballers
Association football midfielders
Bundesliga players
2. Bundesliga players
Bayer 04 Leverkusen players
SC Fortuna Köln players
Dynamo Dresden players
VfL Wolfsburg players
Sportspeople from Schwerin